The 1902 Colorado Agricultural Aggies football team represented Colorado Agricultural College (now known as Colorado State University) in the Colorado Football Association (CFA) during the 1902 college football season.  In their second and final season under head coach C. J. Griffith, the Aggies compiled a 1–3–2 record (0–3–1 against CFA opponents) and were outscored by a total of 62 to 47.

Schedule

References

Colorado Agricultural
Colorado State Rams football seasons
Colorado Agricultural Aggies football